Swanee Grace Hunt (born May 1, 1950) is an American writer, academic, and former diplomat.

Hunt is a lecturer in public policy at Harvard Kennedy School and was the founding director of the Women and Public Policy Program at the Kennedy School. From 1993 to 1997, she served as United States Ambassador to Austria. She is a recipient of the PEN/New England Award for non-fiction.

Early life 
Hunt was born May 1, 1950 in Dallas, Texas, the youngest of four children born to the oil tycoon H.L. Hunt and Ruth Ray. However, not until her father's first wife died did Swanee Hunt's parents marry in 1957 and it was only then that she and her siblings moved into the Hunt mansion, built to resemble its namesake, Mount Vernon.

Hunt grew up in Dallas, Texas, where she attended the Hockaday School. She lived for many years in Denver, Colorado, where she was active in many community and philanthropic activities. Her several siblings include sisters Helen LaKelly Hunt and June Hunt.

Education 
While Hunt had hoped to attend college in the east, her ultra-conservative father refused, so Hunt began college in her hometown at Southern Methodist University. Hunt earned her BA in philosophy from Texas Christian University, an MA in psychology from Ball State University, and an MA in religion and a doctorate in theology from Iliff School of Theology.

Career
Hunt was appointed in 1993 as ambassador to Austria, where she was notable for writing a weekly newspaper column and radio program. 

In 1997, Hunt helped establish the Women and Public Policy Program at Harvard Kennedy School. Since stepping down as Director of the Program in 2008, she has continued on at the Kennedy School as the Eleanor Roosevelt Lecturer in Public Policy.

Personal life
At age 20, Hunt married Mark Meeks, a seminary student. Hunt gave birth to daughter Lillian in 1982, and the marriage dissolved soon after.

In 1985, Hunt married conductor Charles Ansbacher, who died on September 12, 2010. 
She has three children, among them filmmaker Henry Ansbacher, and three grandchildren.

Books 
Her book This Was Not Our War: Bosnian Women Reclaiming the Peace won the 2005 PEN/New England Award for non-fiction and includes a foreword by former president Bill Clinton.

References

External links

 
 
 Swanee Hunt papers at the Sophia Smith Collection, Smith College Special Collections

1950 births
Living people
Ambassadors of the United States to Austria
Hunt family
Harvard Kennedy School faculty
People from Dallas
Texas Christian University alumni
Ball State University alumni
Hockaday School alumni
American women ambassadors